Steffen Glacier is a major outlet glacier of the Northern Patagonian Ice Field in Aysén del General Carlos Ibáñez del Campo Region of Chile. It is the southernmost outlet glacier of the Northern Patagonian Ice Field and ends up in a lagoon from where Huemules River is born. The glacier is named after Hans Steffen a German geographer who explored Aysén del General Carlos Ibáñez del Campo Region on behalf of the Chilean government before the General Treaty of Arbitration between Chile and the Argentine Republic of 1902.

See also
Katalalixar National Reserve
Cerro Arenales
List of glaciers

References 

  See Figure 55 in this USGS study for a map and discussion of the glacier's advances and retreats

Glaciers of Aysén Region